Nebo – eto ya (literally: Heaven - It's Me) - is a 2004 studio album of Sofia Rotaru, recorded at Artur-Music in Ukraine. The album was released in the autumn of 2004 in Russia and Ukraine as well as worldwide simultaneously. The album includes  earlier unreleased singles and two remixes of the song White Dance (. Besides the original playing time of 47:54, the album includes a bonus and a music video for White Dance by Oleg Gusev, filmed at Lenfilm. The original discs sold with 1.700.000 copies.

Track listing

Languages of performance 
Songs are performed in Russian language.

References

External links 
 Official CD Discography of Sofia Rotaru
 "Fortuna" Fan Club
 Review byRuslan Shulga of the new album of Sofia Rotaru "Sky - It's Me" (label "Artur-Music", 2004)

2004 albums
Sofia Rotaru albums